This is a list of Western Australian musicians, (artists and bands) from all genres.

Because of the relative isolation of the state and the capital city of Perth from the rest of Australia, band membership has often been characterised by associations with other bands in the region.

See also
Music of Perth

References

 
Western Australia
Western Australia-related lists